Yunhe may refer to the following places in China:

Yunhe County (云和县), Lishui, Zhejiang
Yunhe District (运河区), Cangzhou, Hebei
Yunhe, Pizhou (运河镇), town in Pizhou City, Xuzhou, Jiangsu
Yunhe, Xiangshui County (运河镇), town in Xiangshui County, Yancheng, Jiangsu
Yunhe Subdistrict, Hangzhou (运河街道), in Linping District, Hangzhou, Zhejiang
Yunhe Subdistrict, Dezhou (运河街道), in Decheng District, Dezhou, Shandong
Yunhe Subdistrict, Zaozhuang (运河街道), in Tai'erzhuang District, Zaozhuang, Shandong